Kazys Bradūnas (11 February 1917 – 9 February 2009) was a Lithuanian émigré poet and editor. He was born in Kiršai, in the Lithuania District of Ober Ost, a territory occupied by the German Empire.

He graduated from Vilnius University where he studied Lithuanian language and literature. During the post-war period he lived in Displaced Persons camps in Germany. In 1944 Bradūnas emigrated to the U.S., and lived in Baltimore and Chicago. In 1995 he returned to Lithuania and then lived in the capital, Vilnius, until his death.

Editorial work 
Bradūnas edited literary and cultural journals Literatūros lankai, Aidai and  the Saturday cultural supplement of the Lithuanian daily Draugas in Chicago.

He was one of the most virile émigré editors of collective works on poetry and literature. Bradūnas together with the literature critic and professor of Ohio State University, Rimvydas Šilbajoris, edited an anthology Lietuvių egzodo literatūra, 1940–1990 (Literature of Lithuanian Exodus, 1940–1990) published in Chicago, 1992.

The Earth Literary Movement 
Bradūnas was one of the founders of the "Žemė" (Earth) literary movement and one of the editors of the same name anthology published in 1951 in Los Angeles. The participants of the "Žemė" anthology were Kazys Bradūnas, Juozas Kėkštas, Vytautas Mačernis (post-humously), Henrikas Nagys, Alfonsas Nyka-Niliūnas.

The movement was advocating Lithuanian poetry with distinct roots in the earth, drawing its strength from Lithuania's agricultural heritage and folklore. "They fused the Lithuanian spirit with the pathos of the modern world's poetic forms and, it can be said, laid the foundation for the modern poetry to be written later in Lithuania" (per Kornelijus Platelis).

Poetry 
Linguist, author and professor at Ohio State University Rimvydas Šilbajoris wrote about Bradūnas’ poetry in Lithuanian Quarterly Journal of Arts and Sciences "Lituanus": "Lyric poetry, consisting as it does of brief statements of experience, was able to respond most quickly and sensitively to the fact of exile. Some poets reacted in simple and naive anguish, like small children awakened suddenly in an unfamiliar place.

Of these, Bradūnas communicated most directly the physical sense of loss which overwhelms a farmer torn away from the familiar objects in his native house and field. His first book in exile, The Alien Bread (1945), is full of small painful vignettes of daily experience where the smell of a flower, a bend in the river, or the pale light of the morning would deceive and comfort the traveler by their intimate familiarity — only to shock him afterwards with the realization that the flower was not known at home, the river bears some strange German name, and the morning promises another day of hard labor for alien masters. Naturally enough, the dispossessed farmer, Bradūnas, was at the center of the new mythology.

In several collections of poetry entitled Nine Ballads (1955), Marshland Fires (1958) and The Silver Bridles (1964), he elaborated the concept of man's existence as a sacrifice at the altar of life and thus also at the altar of both pagan and Christian God, in the native land, over the course of centuries.

His poems are complex in their implied references to the continuum of life through all the Lithuanian generations which had sacrificed themselves in order that their land should prosper green again and again".

Works

Poetry collections 
 Vilniaus varpai : sonetai. (1943)
 Pėdos arimuos : eilėraščiai. (1944)
 Svetimoji duona : eilėraščiai. (1945)
 Apeigos : eilėraščiai. (1948)
 Devynios baladės. (1955)
 Morenų ugnys : eilėraščiai. (1958)
 Sidabrinės kamanos. (1964)
 Alkana kelionė : [eilėraščiai]. (1976)
 Užeigoje prie Vilniaus vieškelio (1981) 
 Prierašai : [eilėraščiai]. (1983)  
 Krikšto vanduo Joninių naktį : [eilėraščiai]. (1987)
 Duona ir druska : poezija. (1992) 
 Apie žemę ir dangų : eilėraščiai. (1997)

Selected works 
 Įaugom Nemuno upyne : rinktinė. (1990)
 Prie vieno stalo : poezijos rinktinė. (1990)
 Iš grumsto ir iš dvasios. (1994)
 Lietuviškoji trilogija. (1994) 
 Sutelktinė : eilėraščiai. (2001)

Poems 
 Maras : poema. (1947)  
 Sonatos ir fugos : susitikimai su Čiurlioniu. (1967)
 Donelaičio kapas : eilėraščiai. (1970)  
 Pokalbiai su karalium : anno domini 1323–1973. (1973)

Edited works of poetry and literature 
 Žemė (1951) 
 Lietuvių poezija išeivijoje, 1945–1971 (1971)
 "Poezija" by Vytautas Mačernis (1961) 
 Lietuvių literatūra svetur, 1945–1967 (1968) 
 Antologija "Keturi" (1986)
 Lietuvių egzodo literatūra, 1940–1990 (1992)

Libretto 
 Libretto for the opera, Magnus Dux, by Darius Lapinskas (1984).

Awards and honors
 National Prize Laureate (1993)
 Winner of National Poetry Contest for Poetry Spring (2002)

Sources 
 Lithuanian Literature Encyclopedia
 Poetry of Kazys Bradunas in English
 Poetry of Kazys Bradunas in Lithuanian

External links

1917 births
2009 deaths
People from Vilkaviškis District Municipality
Lithuanian male poets
Lithuanian-American culture in Chicago
Writers from Baltimore
Writers from Chicago
Recipients of the Lithuanian National Prize
Vilnius University alumni
20th-century poets